Carotenoid 1,2-hydratase (CrtC) is an enzyme with systematic name lycopene hydro-lyase (1-hydroxy-1,2-dihydrolycopene-forming). This enzyme catalyses the following chemical reaction

 (1) 1-hydroxy-1,2-dihydrolycopene  lycopene + H2O
 (2) 1,1'-dihydroxy-1,1',2,2'-tetrahydrolycopene  1-hydroxy-1,2-dihydrolycopene + H2O

In Rubrivivax gelatinosus and Thiocapsa roseopersicina both products are formed.

References

External links 
 

EC 4.2.1